Danielle Leigh Curiel (born December 20, 1994), known professionally as DaniLeigh, is an  American singer, songwriter, rapper, dancer, and choreographer. Initially appearing as a backup dancer, Curiel began her career by posting covers of popular songs on YouTube before moving to Los Angeles, where she began choreographing for other artists and dancing. She made a career breakthrough after working with Prince on the music video for his single "Breakfast Can Wait". DaniLeigh was signed to Def Jam Records in 2017, releasing mixtapes and singles starting that year.

Early and personal life
Curiel was born on December 20, 1994, in Miami, Florida, to  Dominican parents. She was deeply interested in music during her youth, and cites Missy Elliott, Aaliyah, Drake, and Rihanna as influences. She started dancing at the age of 12 and singing at the age of 14, though she was initially too shy to sing in front of others until she received positive feedback. Though she started posting vocal covers of songs such as Musiq Soulchild's "So Beautiful" on YouTube, her career did not officially start until she moved to Los Angeles, where she made connections and started off as a backup dancer to artists such as Pharrell Williams and Nelly Furtado. She also formed part of the pop duo Curly Fryz with her sister. DaniLeigh has a daughter named Velour with rapper DaBaby.

Career
Curiel was asked by Prince to direct the video for his single "Breakfast Can Wait" when she was 18 years old. Following the video's success, Prince continued mentoring DaniLeigh until his death in 2016. She released her first single "D.O.S.E" in 2015, but her first successful single was "Play", released in 2017. The single is an empowerment song for women and Latinos, and features Mexican-American rapper Kap G.

After signing with Def Jam Records, she released her first EP, Summer with Friends, in 2017, followed up by The Plan in 2018. The latter features appearances by rappers YG, Lil Yachty, Lil Baby, and YBN Nahmir. She later released a few more singles such as "Lil Bebe", which was remixed featuring vocals from Lil Baby, and "Easy", which was remixed featuring vocals from singer Chris Brown. She has also made a cameo appearance in Megan Thee Stallion's "Hot Girl Summer" music video. In late 2019, she choreographed for DaBaby’s music video “BOP on Broadway”.

In January 2021, the singer issued an apology after posting part of a song called "Yellow Bone" on social media, which was criticized for promoting colorism.

Musical style
DaniLeigh incorporates elements of hip hop and Latin music into her primarily R&B-style music.

Discography

Albums
 Summer with Friends (2017)
 The Plan (2018)
 My Present (2019)
 Movie (2020)
 In My Feelings (2020)

EPs
 Summer with Friends (2017)
 My Side (2022)
 "My present" (2019)

Singles

References

External links
Official website

1994 births
Living people
21st-century American women singers
Dancers from Florida
Singers from Florida
American choreographers
American contemporary R&B singers
American women hip hop musicians
American women pop singers
American singers of Dominican Republic descent
Def Jam Recordings artists
21st-century American singers
Hispanic and Latino American women singers